Archibald Samuel Dyke (September 1886 – c.1955) was an English footballer. He played for Stoke, Port Vale, Aston Villa, Stafford Rangers, Coventry City, Blackpool, and Congleton Town.

Career
Dyke played for Chesterton, Newcastle Congregational, and Newcastle P.S.A., before joining Birmingham & District League side Stoke in 1909. He played one game in the 1909–10 and 1910–11 campaigns, before making 24 appearances in 1911–12, scoring league goals against Plymouth Argyle and Bristol Rovers. He then played 15 league and three FA Cup games in 1913–14, scoring once against Treharris Athletic.

He switched clubs to nearby rivals Port Vale in the summer of 1912. He made his debut in a 5–0 defeat at Stalybridge Celtic in a Central League match on 3 September 1912, and impressed enough to hold on to a first team spot. He lost his place in March 1913 and returned to Stoke that summer, having played 19 league games for the "Valiants". Dyke then moved on to Aston Villa. Whilst with Villa he guested for Vale during the war in 1916. He rejoined the club permanently in August 1919, but after being elected back into the Football League in October 1919 the club could not negotiate his transfer. He moved on to Stafford Rangers, Coventry City, Blackpool and Congleton Town.

Personal life
Dyke enlisted in the Royal Army Veterinary Corps in September 1915 during the First World War. He was transferred to the Royal Horse Artillery as a gunner and served in Palestine. He was medically discharged in August 1919 after suffering dysentery.

Career statistics

References
Specific

General
 

1886 births
1955 deaths
Sportspeople from Newcastle-under-Lyme
English footballers
Association football midfielders
Stoke City F.C. players
Port Vale F.C. players
Aston Villa F.C. players
Port Vale F.C. wartime guest players
Stafford Rangers F.C. players
Coventry City F.C. players
Blackpool F.C. players
Congleton Town F.C. players
English Football League players
British Army personnel of World War I
Royal Army Veterinary Corps soldiers
Royal Horse Artillery soldiers
Morecambe F.C. wartime guest players
Military personnel from Staffordshire